William Harcourt may refer to:
William Vernon Harcourt (scientist) (1789–1871), British scientist
William Harcourt (politician) (1827–1904), British Liberal politician
William Harcourt (martyr), Catholic martyr, victim of the Titus Oates plot
William Harcourt, villain in the film Alien Nation (named for the people above)
William Harcourt, 3rd Earl Harcourt, English nobleman and soldier
William Harcourt (MP for Berkshire), in 1491, MP for Berkshire (UK Parliament constituency)
 William Harcourt, 2nd Viscount Harcourt

See also
Willie Harcourt-Cooze, entrepreneur and chocolatier